TRT Arabia, is an Arabic television channel of TRT, broadcasting to Arabic-speaking audiences in Turkey and the Middle East, 24 hours a day, on subjects, events, and news as well as soap operas from and pertaining to Turkey. It was launched on 4 April 2010.

Turan Kachlakji was appointed director of the channel in March 2015.

See also 
 List of Arabic-language television channels
 Television in Turkey
 TRT

References

External links 

  TRT Arabi Official Website

Television stations in Turkey
Television channels and stations established in 2010
Arabic-language television stations
2010 establishments in Turkey
Turkish Radio and Television Corporation